Me and a Monkey on the Moon is the tenth and final album by English alternative rock band Felt, released in 1989. It was originally issued on Mike Alway's él label, part of Cherry Red. In a review for Sounds, Roy Wilkinson described it as "perhaps their finest album yet."

Recording 
The album was recorded at ICC Studios in Eastbourne between 5 and 14 August 1989, after earlier demos had been recorded in Brighton. Lawrence, Martin Duffy and Gary Ainge had moved to Brighton from Birmingham in 1988; but as Marco Thomas had remained in the Midlands, Robert Young from Primal Scream was invited to play bass on the recording. B. J. Cole visited the sessions for a day to add the pedal steel guitar heard on the tracks "I Can't Make Love to You Anymore" and "New Day Dawning".

Track listing 
All songs written by Lawrence.

Personnel 
 Lawrence – vocals
 Martin Duffy – synthesizer, Fender Rhodes electric piano, ARP String Ensemble, piano
 Gary Ainge – drums
with
 John Mohan – lead guitar
 Richard Left – rhythm guitar
 Robert Young – bass
 Rose McDowall – backing vocals
 Pete Astor – backing vocals
 B. J. Cole – pedal steel guitar

References 

Felt (band) albums
1989 albums
Cherry Red Records albums